Anatoliy Saulevych (26 March 1959 – 13 November 2021) was a Ukrainian professional footballer who played as defender and a youth football coach.

Playing and coaching career

Born in Kyiv, Saulevych is a product of the local Sportinternat, where his first coach was Viktor Kyianchenko. In 1978 he made his debut in the Soviet First League with Karpaty Lviv. The following year, he achieved promotion to the Soviet Top League with the club, where in 1980 he played 26 matches, scoring one goal. At the end of the season, Karpaty were relegated to the First League again.

In 1982–1985 Saulevych played for another Lviv-based First League team, SKA Lviv. He later played for clubs playing in the Soviet Second League: Nyva Ternopil, Podillya Khmelnytskyi, Karpaty Lviv and Zaria Bălți. He finished his career in 1992 with Ukrainian First League club Halychyna Drohobych.

He graduated from Lviv State University of Physical Culture. 

After his retirement he worked as an assistant coach at the Karpaty Lviv youth sportive school.

He died in Lviv on 13 November 2021.

References

External links
 Profile at Footballfacts.ru
 

1959 births
2021 deaths
Footballers from Kyiv
Soviet footballers
Ukrainian footballers
Association football defenders
Soviet Union youth international footballers
Lviv State University of Physical Culture alumni
SKA Lviv players
FC Karpaty Lviv players
FC Nyva Ternopil players
CSF Bălți players
FC Podillya Khmelnytskyi players
FC Halychyna Drohobych players
Soviet Top League players
Soviet First League players
Soviet Second League players
Ukrainian First League players
Burials at Lychakiv Cemetery